Josh Bento (born January 19, 1993) is an American soccer player.

External links
 USL Pro profile

1993 births
Living people
American soccer players
Phoenix FC players
USL Championship players
Soccer players from New Mexico
Association football midfielders
People from Santa Fe County, New Mexico
Glendale Community College (California) alumni
High school soccer coaches in the United States